Dankovci is a village in the Municipality of Puconci in the Prekmurje region of Slovenia.

The section of the Slovenian Railways line from Murska Sobota to Hodoš runs through the village.

References

External links 
Dankovci on Geopedia

Populated places in the Municipality of Puconci